The De La Vergne was an American automobile manufactured between 1895 and 1896 by John Chester De La Vergne. De La Vergne was a brewer who was manufacturing refrigerators, when he commissioned several vehicles to be built by the Hincks & Johnson Company of Bridgeport, Connecticut and the Valentine, Linn & Son Company of Brooklyn. At least four were made, with the cars being sold to rich and prominent citizens in New York. De La Vergne's death in May 1896 put an end to the venture.

References

External links
1895 auto-buggy
1895 hunting trap

Vehicles introduced in 1895
1890s cars
Defunct motor vehicle manufacturers of the United States